Potapovo is a rural locality in Brezhnevsky Selsoviet Rural Settlement, Kursky District, Kursk Oblast, Russia. Population:

Geography 
The village is located on the Malaya Kuritsa River (a right tributary of the Bolshaya Kuritsa River in the Seym River basin), 87 km from the Russia–Ukraine border, 19 km north-west of Kursk, 7.5 km from the selsoviet center – Verkhnekasinovo.

 Climate
Potapovo has a warm-summer humid continental climate (Dfb in the Köppen climate classification).

Transport 
Potapovo is located 9 km from the federal route  Crimea Highway (a part of the European route ), 1 km from the road of intermunicipal significance  ("Crimea Highway" – Verkhnyaya Medveditsa – Razinkovo), 21 km from the nearest railway station Kursk (railway lines: Oryol – Kursk, Kursk – 146 km and Lgov-I – Kursk).

The rural locality is situated 24.5 km from Kursk Vostochny Airport, 137 km from Belgorod International Airport and 226 km from Voronezh Peter the Great Airport.

References

Notes

Sources

Rural localities in Kursky District, Kursk Oblast